Markus Solbakken (born 25 July 2000) is a Norwegian football midfielder who plays for Viking.

Career
He is a son of Ståle Solbakken. While his father was a football player and later manager, mostly abroad, the family settled in Hamar and Solbakken came through the youth ranks of Hamarkameratene. He made his senior debut in 2016 and was a prolific Norway youth international, making his debut for Norway U21 at the age of 18. In the 2020 1. divisjon he passed the mark of 100 league games for Hamkam.

Ahead of the 2021 season he was bought by Stabæk. He made his Eliteserien debut in May 2021 against Haugesund. After Stabæk were relegated, Solbakken transferred to Viking in February 2022. He signed a four-year contract with the club.

Career statistics

References

2000 births
Living people
Sportspeople from Hamar
Norwegian footballers
Hamarkameratene players
Stabæk Fotball players
Viking FK players
Norwegian Second Division players
Norwegian First Division players
Eliteserien players
Association football midfielders
Norway youth international footballers
Norway under-21 international footballers